is a Ryukyuan gusuku in Kumejima, Okinawa, on Kume Island. It was built on a hill overlooking Eef beach.

References

Castles in Okinawa Prefecture
Kumejima, Okinawa